City Calm Down are a four-piece band from Melbourne, Australia. The band's four members are Jack Bourke (vocals), Sam Mullaly (synths/keys), Jeremy Sonnenberg (bass), and Lee Armstrong (drums/percussion). Their debut album In a Restless House debuted at number 25 on the ARIA Charts, and the single "Rabbit Run" from the album came in 137th place on the Triple J Hottest 100 for 2015. They are signed with the Melbourne-based record label, I Oh You.

The band have played multiple sold-out tours and major festivals including Splendour in the Grass, Laneway, Falls, and The Great Escape. City Calm Down have also performed with Alt-J, Chvrches, and Bombay Bicycle Club. City Calm Down's song "Your Fix" appears in the 2017 game AFL: Evolution.

The band's second full-length album Echoes in Blue was released on 6 April 2018. Featuring the singles "In the Modern Land", "Joan, I'm Disappearing" and "Pride", the album debuted at number 20 on the ARIA Albums Chart and was given a 9/10 score by Beat Magazine.

Following the release of their third album Television in 2019, City Calm Down announced that the band was "going on indefinite hiatus".

Discography

Albums

Extended plays

Singles

References

External links

Australian electronic musicians
Musical groups from Melbourne
Musical quartets